Myrna Dell (born Marilyn Adele Dunlap; March 5, 1924 – February 11, 2011) was an American actress, model, and writer who appeared in numerous motion pictures and television programs over four decades.  A Hollywood glamour girl in the early part of her career, she is best known today for her work in B-pictures, particularly  film noir thrillers and Westerns.

Early life and career 
Dell's mother was silent-film actress Carol Price. Dell entered show business when she was 16 as a dancer  with the Earl Carroll Revue in New York. Her film debut came in A Night at Earl Carroll's (1940), after which she appeared in Ziegfeld Girl (1941), Raiders of Red Gap (1943), 'and Up in Arms (1943).

She found work at Monogram Pictures, a "budget" studio specializing in inexpensive entertainments for double-feature theaters. She appeared as an ingenue in a B-western, Arizona Whirlwind (1944), with silent-screen veterans Ken Maynard, Hoot Gibson, and Bob Steele.

She signed a contract with RKO Radio Pictures in 1944, and followed the path of other RKO starlets: bit parts and chorus-girl appearances in features, then dialogue roles in short subjects starring Leon Errol or Edgar Kennedy, and then featured roles in "B" pictures and smaller roles in "A" pictures. Myrna Dell was very prolific at RKO, and many fans know her best from these pictures. Beginning as a showgirl in the Eddie Cantor-Joan Davis musical comedy Show Business (1944), Dell gradually worked her way up, from a Zane Grey western to gradually larger roles in three of the studio's popular Falcon mysteries with Tom Conway, and finally becoming established as a hard-boiled glamour girl in film noir thrillers like Nocturne (1946), The Locket (1946), and Destination Murder (1950). She once told a reporter that she loathed the glamour-girl image, stating, "After a time... a girl gets bored with the glamour, the atmosphere, the drinking, the cigarettes to smoke, the wolves." Between assignments she returned to the Leon Errol unit to play dangerous blondes opposite the flustered comic, and would even play incidental walk-ons not calling for any dialogue (she's the nightclub blonde silently kibitzing Tommy Noonan's card game in the 1946 comedy Ding Dong Williams).

In 1948 her term contract with RKO ran out, and she began freelancing at other studios. She played sultry blondes for Republic, Columbia, Universal, Paramount, and Lippert. She occasionally returned to RKO and Monogram; her last major role in motion pictures was as the femme fatale in Monogram's Bowery Boys comedy Here Come the Marines (1952).

With roles in feature films becoming fewer, Dell turned to television in 1952 for the China Smith series. She went on to appear on such programs as  Gang Busters, Lux Video Theatre, Crusader, Dragnet, The Ethel Barrymore Theatre, Maverick, Pete and Gladys, Batman, Hazel, The Donna Reed Show, and The Texan. Her last film appearance was in Buddy Buddy (1981) as well as an uncredited appearance in an episode of Unsolved Mysteries.

In her later years, she worked as a writer for Hollywood: Then and Now Magazine in which she shared countless stories about her days as an actress and thanking such figures as Jack L. Warner, Louis B. Mayer, and Samuel Goldwyn for their contributions to the film industry. She and actress Jacqueline White are often credited for creating autograph shows.

Personal life
On June 15, 1951, Dell married Jack Buchtel, a restaurateur. In the 1960s, she married Herbert Patterson, an actor.

A California resident all her life, Dell continued living in the state by spending her final years in Studio City, California, answering fan mail and keeping her fans up to date through her personal website. She died from natural causes on February 11, 2011, at her studio apartment one month shy of her 87th birthday. She was survived by one daughter, Laura Patterson, who spread her ashes next to the Hollywood Sign.

Filmography

1940: A Night at Earl Carroll's - Showgirl (uncredited)
1941: Ziegfeld Girl - Ziegfeld Girl (uncredited)
1943: Raiders of Red Gap - Jane Roberts
1943: In Old Oklahoma - Blonde (uncredited)
1943: Jive Junction - Senior Hostess (uncredited)
1943: Raiders of Red Gap - Jane Roberts
1944: Up in Arms - Goldwyn Girl (uncredited)
1944: Arizona Whirlwind - Ruth Hampton
1944: Show Business - Showgirl (uncredited)
1944: Thirty Seconds Over Tokyo - Girl in Officers' Club (uncredited)
1944: Belle of the Yukon - Chorine (uncredited)
1945: Wanderer of the Wasteland - Gambler's Girl (uncredited)
1945: The Falcon in San Francisco - Beautiful Girl in Hotel Hall (uncredited)
1945: Radio Stars on Parade - Phil's Secretary (uncredited)
1945: Double Honeymoon (Short) - Newlywed Wife
1945: It's Your Move (Short) - Neighbor (uncredited)
1945: Beware of Redheads (Short) - Gloria Richards, the Redhead
1945: Man Alive - River Boat Captain's Daughter (uncredited)
1946: Maid Trouble (Short)
1946: The Spiral Staircase - Murder Victim (uncredited)
1946: Oh, Professor Behave! (Short)
1946: The Falcon's Alibi - Falcon's Dancing Partner (uncredited)
1946: Ding Dong Williams - Club Creon Blonde (uncredited)
1946: Twin Husbands (Short) - Miss Ward
1946: I'll Take Milk (Short) - Barbara
1946: Step by Step - Gretchen
1946: Nocturne - Susan
1946: Lady Luck - Mabel (uncredited)
1946: Vacation in Reno - Madeleine Dumont
1946: The Falcon's Adventure - Doris Blanding
1946: The Locket - Thelma
1948: The Judge Steps Out - Mrs. Joan Winthrop
1948: Fighting Father Dunne - Paula Hendricks
1948: Guns of Hate - Dixie Merritt
1948: The Uninvited Blonde (Short) - Lulu, The Uninvited Blonde  
1949: Rose of the Yukon - Rose Flambeau 
1949: Search for Danger - Wilma Rogers
1949: The Lost Tribe - Norina
1949: Roughshod - Helen Carter
1949: Lust for Gold - Lucille (uncredited)
1949: The Girl from Jones Beach - Lorraine Scott
1949: The Gal Who Took the West - Nancy
1950: Radar Secret Service - Marge
1950: Destination Murder - Alice Wentworth
1950: The Furies -  Dallas Hart
1950: Joe Palooka in the Squared Circle - Sandra Reed
1951: Never Trust a Gambler - Dolores Alden
1951: Secrets of Beauty - Kay Joyce
1951: The Strip - Paulette Ardrey
1951: The Bushwhackers - Norah Taylor
1951: Reunion in Reno - Mrs. Virginia Mason
1952: Gang Busters (TV Series) - Norma Breighlee / Officer Jone Perlie
1952: Here Come the Marines - Lulu Mae
1952: China Smith (TV Series) - 'Empress' Shira
1953: Mr. & Mrs. North (TV Series) - Fifi LaMer
1954: Lux Video Theatre (TV Series) - Cynthia
1954: The New Adventures of China Smith (TV Series)
1955: Night Freight - Sally
1955: Toughest Man Alive - Nancy
1955: Last of the Desperados - Clara Wightman
1956: Jungle Jim (TV Series) - Mickey Worth
1956: Crusader (TV Series) - Julie
1956: The Naked Hills - Aggie
1956: Ethel Barrymore Theater (TV Series)
1956: Dragnet (TV Series)
1956: The Millionaire (TV Series) - Helen
1953-1957: Schlitz Playhouse (TV Series) - Mae Holmes / Sally
1957: State Trooper (TV Series) - Carol Smith
1957: The Adventures of Jim Bowie (TV Series) - Helen Harris
1958: Maverick (TV Series) - Anita
1959: U.S. Marshal (TV Series)
1959: The Texan (TV Series) - Miss Delly
1960: Ma Barker's Killer Brood - Lou
1961: Pete and Gladys - Mrs. Wingfield
1963: The Donna Reed Show (TV Series) - Saleswoman
1963: Hazel (TV Series) - Receptionist
1966: Batman (TV Series) - Pedestrian
1978: The One Man Jury - Landlady
1981: Buddy Buddy - Cashier (final film role)

References

External links 

 

1924 births
2011 deaths
Actresses from Los Angeles
American film actresses
American television actresses
Writers from California
American memoirists
Western (genre) film actresses
Western (genre) television actors
American female dancers
American dancers
20th-century American actresses
American women memoirists
People from Studio City, Los Angeles
21st-century American women